Shanu may refer to:

Shanu (actress), Bangladeshi film actress
Herzekiah Andrew Shanu (1858–1905), African photographer and abuse campaigner
Shanavas Shanu, Indian television actor
Shiba Shanu (Chowdhury Mazhar Ali, born 1970), Bangladeshi actor
Shanu Lahiri (1928–2013), Indian painter and art educator
Shanu Saini (born 1997), Indian cricketer

See also
Shanus, a genus of East Asian sheet weavers